KSNE-FM (106.5 MHz) is a radio station broadcasting an adult contemporary music format. Licensed to Las Vegas, Nevada, United States, the station serves the Las Vegas area.  The station is owned by iHeartMedia.  Its studios are in Las Vegas a mile west of the Strip and its transmitter is on Black Mountain in Henderson.

KSNE broadcasts two channels in the HD Radio format.

History

KSNE first signed on the air in 1987 as KRLV 106.5 FM. The call letters were changed from KRLV to KSNE in 1994.  KSNE/KRLV ran its own locally produced weeknight show known as Love Songs For Las Vegas hosted by local jock Robert Holiday in the same time slot. "Love Songs For Las Vegas" ran from 1991–1998, and was replaced by the syndicated Delilah show until 2010. The Delilah Show came back in late 2011. KRLV 106.5 was known as Continuous Soft Rock in 1987 until 1995. KRLV played Hot AC until the changeover to call letters KSNE.  The KRLV callsign moved to 1340 AM.

The new KSNE 106.5 FM became known as "Continuous Soft Favorites" or "Continuous Soft Hits". KSNE began to play more soft AC focusing on such artists as Kenny G, Michael Bolton, Amy Grant, etc.  This format continued until the mid-2000s when KSNE began to add more soft rock and current hits.  In recent years, KSNE has become a more upbeat mainstream AC station, and today almost all of the songs heard on KSNE are from 1980 until the present.  Sunny 106.5 plays Christmas music during the holiday season, as so happens to most iHeart-owned AC stations, like KOST, as well as other AC stations that are not owned by iHeartMedia.

Sunny 106.5 has previously jingles from JAM Creative. From 2014–2016, Sunny 106.5 has used the KVIL Reelworld jingles package. Since 2016, Sunny 106.5 now uses the KOST 2016 jingles packages created for its sister station KOST 103.5 in Los Angeles.

References

External links

Mainstream adult contemporary radio stations in the United States
SNE-FM
Radio stations established in 1987
1987 establishments in Nevada
IHeartMedia radio stations